The 2010–11 San Jose Sharks season was the team's' 20th season in the National Hockey League (NHL).

Off-season 
Team captain Rob Blake retired on June 18, 2010.

The Sharks announced that they would not offer Evgeni Nabokov a contract for the 2010–11 season.

The Sharks re-signed centers Joe Pavelski and Patrick Marleau to four-year contracts on June 24, 2010.

The Sharks re-signed defenseman Niclas Wallin and center Scott Nichol to one-year contracts on June 26, 2010.

Sharks signed free agent goaltender Antero Nittymaki to a two-year, $4 million contract on July 1, 2010, replacing long-time goaltender Evgeni Nabokov.

The Sharks signed free agent goaltender Antti Niemi to a one-year, $2 million contract on September 2, 2010.

The Sharks selected center Joe Thornton as new team captain for the 2010–11 season. Ryane Clowe will be alternate captain on road games, and Patrick Marleau during home games. Dan Boyle was made a permanent alternate captain.

Antti Niemi has also signed a four-year contract with the Sharks as well.

Pre-season

Regular season

Standings

Divisional standings

Conference standings 

x – Went into playoffs

Schedule and results

Green background indicates win (2 points).
Red background indicates regulation loss (0 points).
White background indicates overtime/shootout loss (1 point).

Playoffs

The Sharks clinched a playoff spot after beating the Dallas Stars 6–0 on March 31, 2011 in front of the sellout crowd of 17,562 at the HP Pavilion. This makes it seven consecutive seasons of making the playoffs for the Sharks. The Sharks also made the Conference Finals for the third time in franchise history.

Legend:

Player statistics

Skaters
Note: GP = Games played; G = Goals; A = Assists; Pts = Points; +/− = Plus/minus; PIM = Penalty minutes
Updated April 11, 2011.

Goaltenders
GP = Games played; MIN = Time On Ice in minutes; W = Wins; L = Losses; OT = Overtime losses; GA = Goals against; GAA = Goals against average; SA = Shots against; SV = Saves; SV% = Save percentage; SO = Shutouts; G = Goals; A = Assists;
PEN = Penalty Time in minutes

†Denotes player spent time with another team before joining Sharks. Stats reflect time with the Sharks only.
‡Traded mid-season
Bold/italics denotes franchise record

Awards and records

Awards

Records

Milestones

Transactions 
On January 20, 2011, the Sharks signed Jordan White, a University of British Columbia Thunderbirds goalie to a one-day amateur contract to provide emergency backup goalie for the game against the Vancouver Canucks after Antero Niittymaki was injured during a morning practice session. White wore uniform number 35 but did not see any on-ice game time.

The Sharks have been involved in the following transactions during the 2010–11 season.

Trades

Free agents acquired

Free agents lost

Claimed via waivers

Lost via waivers

Lost via retirement

Players signings

Draft picks 

San Jose's picks at the 2010 NHL Entry Draft in Los Angeles.

Farm teams

Worcester Sharks
The Sharks' affiliate in the American Hockey League is the Worcester Sharks.

Stockton Thunder
The Sharks' affiliate in the ECHL is the Stockton Thunder for 2010–11.

References 

San Jose Sharks seasons
San Jose Sharks season, 2010-11
San Jose
San Jose Sharks
San Jose Sharks